Craigellachie railway station served the village of Craigellachie, Moray, Scotland from 1863 to 1968 on the Morayshire Railway and the Strathspey Railway.

History 
The station opened as Strathspey Junction on 1 July 1863 by the Great North of Scotland Railway. It was renamed Craigellachie on 1 June 1864. There was a large goods yard to the west. The station closed to passengers on 6 May 1968 and to goods traffic on 4 November 1968.

References

External links 

Disused railway stations in Moray
Railway stations in Great Britain opened in 1863
Railway stations in Great Britain closed in 1968
Beeching closures in Scotland
Former Great North of Scotland Railway stations